The Family Law Reform Party was a minor Australian political party that contested the 1996 Lindsay by-election resulting from the voiding of the 1996 election result due to Liberal member-elect Jackie Kelly's continuing New Zealand citizenship.

See also
 Non-Custodial Parents Party (Equal Parenting)

References

1996 establishments in Australia
1999 disestablishments in Australia
Australian family law
Defunct political parties in Australia
Political parties established in 1996
Political parties disestablished in 1999